Louise Joséphine Bourgeois (25 December 191131 May 2010) was a French-American artist. Although she is best known for her large-scale sculpture and installation art, Bourgeois was also a prolific painter and printmaker. She explored a variety of themes over the course of her long career including domesticity and the family, sexuality and the body, as well as death and the unconscious. These themes connect to events from her childhood which she considered to be a therapeutic process. Although Bourgeois exhibited with the Abstract Expressionists and her work has much in common with Surrealism and Feminist art, she was not formally affiliated with a particular artistic movement.

Life

Early life  
Bourgeois was born on 25 December 1911 in Paris, France. She was the middle child of three born to parents Joséphine Fauriaux and Louis Bourgeois. Her parents owned a gallery that dealt primarily in antique tapestries. A few years after her birth, her family moved out of Paris and set up a workshop for tapestry restoration below their apartment in Choisy-le-Roi, for which Bourgeois filled in the designs where they had become worn. The lower part of the tapestries were always damaged which was usually a result of the characters' feet and animals' paws.

In 1930, Bourgeois entered the Sorbonne to study mathematics and geometry, subjects that she valued for their stability, saying "I got peace of mind, only through the study of rules nobody could change."

Her mother died in 1932, while Bourgeois was studying mathematics. Her mother's death inspired her to abandon mathematics and to begin studying art. She continued to study art by joining classes where translators were needed for English-speaking students, especially because translators were not charged tuition. In one such class, Fernand Léger saw her work and told her she was a sculptor, not a painter. Bourgeois took a job as a docent, leading tours at the Musée du Louvre.

Bourgeois graduated from the Sorbonne in 1935. She began studying art in Paris, first at the École des Beaux-Arts and École du Louvre, and after 1932 in the independent academies of Montparnasse and Montmartre such as Académie Colarossi, Académie Ranson, Académie Julian, Académie de la Grande Chaumière and with André Lhote, Fernand Léger, Paul Colin and Cassandre. Bourgeois had a desire for first-hand experience and frequently visited studios in Paris, learning techniques from the artists and assisting with exhibitions. From 1934 to 1938, she is said to have apprenticed herself to some of the so-called "masters" of the time, including Fernand Léger, Paul Colin, and André Lhote. Later, however, Bourgeois became disillusioned with the conception of patriarchal genius which dominated the art world, a change motivated in part by these masters' refusal to recognize women artists.

In 1938, she opened her own gallery in a space next door to her father's tapestry gallery where she showed the work of artists such as Eugène Delacroix, Henri Matisse and Suzanne Valadon, and where she met visiting American art professor Robert Goldwater as a customer. They married and moved to the United States (where he taught at New York University). They had three sons; one was adopted. The marriage lasted until Goldwater's death in 1973.

Bourgeois settled in New York City with her husband in 1938. She continued her education at the Art Students League of New York, studying painting under Vaclav Vytlacil, and also producing sculptures and prints. "The first painting had a grid: the grid is a very peaceful thing because nothing can go wrong ... everything is complete. There is no room for anxiety ... everything has a place, everything is welcome."

Bourgeois incorporated those autobiographical references to her sculpture Quarantania I, on display in the Cullen Sculpture Garden at the Museum of Fine Arts, Houston.

Middle years

For Bourgeois, the early 1940s represented the difficulties of a transition to a new country and the struggle to enter the exhibition world of New York City. Her work during this time was constructed from junkyard scraps and driftwood which she used to carve upright wood sculptures. The impurities of the wood were then camouflaged with paint, after which nails were employed to invent holes and scratches in the endeavor to portray some emotion. The Sleeping Figure is one such example which depicts a war figure that is unable to face the real world due to vulnerability. Throughout her life, Bourgeois's work was created from revisiting her own troubled past as she found inspiration and temporary catharsis from her childhood years and the abuse she suffered from her father.  Slowly she developed more artistic confidence, although her middle years are more opaque, which might be due to the fact that she received very little attention from the art world despite having her first solo show in 1945. In 1951, her father died and she became an American citizen.

In 1945, Bourgeois was featured in an exhibition of fourteen women artists at Peggy Guggenheim's Art of This Century, aptly titled "The Women." While this exhibition stimulated debate about the place of women artists in the art world, it also defined them as separate from their canonized male counterparts and reinforced the damaging notion of a universally feminine experience. Commenting on her reception as a woman artist in the 1940s, Bourgeois said that she doesn't "know what art made by a woman is....There is no feminine experience in art, at least not in my case, because not just by being a woman does one have a different experience."  

In 1954, Bourgeois joined the American Abstract Artists Group, with several contemporaries, among them Barnett Newman and Ad Reinhardt.  At this time she also befriended the artists Willem de Kooning, Mark Rothko, and Jackson Pollock.
As part of the American Abstract Artists Group, Bourgeois made the transition from wood and upright structures to marble, plaster, and bronze as she investigated concerns like fear, vulnerability, and loss of control.  This transition was a turning point. She referred to her art as a series or sequence closely related to days and circumstances, describing her early work as the fear of falling which later transformed into the art of falling and the final evolution as the art of hanging in there.  Her conflicts in real life empowered her to authenticate her experiences and struggles through a unique art form. In 1958, Bourgeois and her husband moved into a terraced house at West 20th Street, in Chelsea, Manhattan, where she lived and worked for the rest of her life.

Despite the fact that she rejected the idea that her art was feminist, Bourgeois's subject was the feminine. Works such as Femme Maison (1946–1947), Torso self-portrait (1963–1964), and Arch of Hysteria (1993), all depict the feminine body. In the late 1960s, her imagery became more explicitly sexual as she explored the relationship between men and women and the emotional impact of her troubled childhood. Sexually explicit sculptures such as Janus Fleuri (1968) show she was not afraid to use the female form in new ways. She stated, "My work deals with problems that are pre-gender," she wrote. "For example, jealousy is not male or female." With the rise of feminism, her work found a wider audience. Despite this assertion, in 1976 Femme Maison was featured on the cover of Lucy Lippard's book From the Center: Feminist Essays on Women's Art and became an icon of the feminist art movement.

Later life 

In 1973, Bourgeois started teaching at the Pratt Institute, Cooper Union, Brooklyn College and the New York Studio School of Drawing, Painting and Sculpture. From 1974 until 1977, Bourgeois worked at the School of Visual Arts in New York where she taught printmaking and sculpture. She also taught for many years in the public schools in Great Neck, Long Island.

In the early 1970s, Bourgeois held gatherings called "Sunday, bloody Sundays" at her home in Chelsea. These salons would be filled with young artists and students whose work would be critiqued by Bourgeois. Bourgeois's ruthlessness in critique and her dry sense of humor led to the naming of these meetings. Bourgeois inspired many young students to make art that was feminist in nature. However, Louise's long-time friend and assistant, Jerry Gorovoy, has stated that Louise considered her own work "pre-gender."

Bourgeois aligned herself with activists and became a member of the Fight Censorship Group, a feminist anti-censorship collective founded by fellow artist Anita Steckel. In the 1970s, the group defended the use of sexual imagery in artwork. Steckel argued, "If the erect penis is not wholesome enough to go into museums, it should not be considered wholesome enough to go into women."

In 1978 Bourgeois was commissioned by the General Services Administration to create Facets of the Sun, her first public sculpture. The work was installed outside of a federal building in Manchester, New Hampshire.
Bourgeois received her first retrospective in 1982, by the Museum of Modern Art in New York City. Until then, she had been a peripheral figure in art whose work was more admired than acclaimed. In an interview with Artforum, timed to coincide with the opening of her retrospective, she revealed that the imagery in her sculptures was wholly autobiographical. She shared with the world that she obsessively relived through her art the trauma of discovering, as a child, that her English governess was also her father's mistress.

Between the years of 1984 and 1986, Bourgeois created a series of sculptures all under the title Nature Study which continued her lifetime commitment of challenging patriarchal standards and traditional methods of femininity in art.

In 1989, Bourgeois made a drypoint etching, Mud Lane, of the home she maintained in Stapleton, Staten Island, which she treated as a sculptural environment rather than a living space.

Bourgeois had another retrospective in 1989 at Documenta 9 in Kassel, Germany. In 1993, when the Royal Academy of Arts staged its comprehensive survey of American art in the 20th century, the organizers did not consider Bourgeois's work of significant importance to include in the survey. However, this survey was criticized for many omissions, with one critic writing that "whole sections of the best American art have been wiped out" and pointing out that very few women were included. In 2000 her works were selected to be shown at the opening of the Tate Modern in London.
In 2001, she showed at the Hermitage Museum.

In 2010, the last year of her life, Bourgeois used her art to speak up for Lesbian, Gay, Bisexual and Transgender (LGBT) equality. She created the piece I Do, depicting two flowers growing from one stem, to benefit the nonprofit organization Freedom to Marry. Bourgeois has said "Everyone should have the right to marry. To make a commitment to love someone forever is a beautiful thing." Bourgeois had a history of activism on behalf of LGBT equality, having created artwork for the AIDS activist organization ACT UP in 1993.

Death 

Bourgeois died of heart failure on 31 May 2010, at the Beth Israel Medical Center in Manhattan.
 Wendy Williams, the managing director of the Louise Bourgeois Studio, announced her death. She had continued to create artwork until her death, her last pieces being finished the week before.

The New York Times said that her work "shared a set of repeated themes, centered on the human body and its need for nurture and protection in a frightening world."

Her husband, Robert Goldwater, died in 1973. She was survived by two sons, Alain Bourgeois and Jean-Louis Bourgeois. Her first son, Michel, died in 1990.

Work

Femme Maison

Femme Maison (1946–47) is a series of paintings in which Bourgeois explores the relationship of a woman and the home. In the works, women's heads have been replaced with houses, isolating their bodies from the outside world and keeping their minds domestic. This theme goes along with the dehumanization of modern art.

Destruction of the Father
Destruction of the Father (1974) is a biographical and a psychological exploration of the power dominance of father and his offspring. The piece is a flesh-toned installation in a soft and womb-like room. Made of plaster, latex, wood, fabric, and red light, Destruction of the Father was the first piece in which she used soft materials on a large scale. Upon entering the installation, the viewer stands in the aftermath of a crime. Set in a stylized dining room (with the dual impact of a bedroom), the abstract blob-like children of an overbearing father have rebelled, murdered, and eaten him.

Exorcism in Art 

In 1982, The Museum of Modern Art in New York City featured unknown artist, Louise Bourgeois' work. She was 70 years old and a mixed media artist who worked on paper and with metal, marble and animal skeletal bones. Childhood family traumas "bred an exorcism in art", and she desperately attempted to purge her unrest through her work. She felt she could get in touch with issues of female identity, the body, and the fractured family long before the art world and society considered them as subjects to be expressed in art.  This was Bourgeois' way to find her center and stabilize her emotional unrest. The New York Times said at the time that "her work is charged with tenderness and violence, acceptance and defiance, ambivalence and conviction."

Cells
While in her eighties, Bourgeois produced two series of enclosed installation works she referred to as Cells. Many are small enclosures into which the viewer is prompted to peer inward at arrangements of symbolic objects; others are small rooms into which the viewer is invited to enter. In the cell pieces, Bourgeois uses earlier sculptural forms, found objects as well as personal items that carried strong personal emotional charge for the artist.

The cells enclose psychological and intellectual states, primarily feelings of fear and pain. Bourgeois stated that the Cells represent "different types of pain; physical, emotional and psychological, mental and intellectual ... Each Cell deals with a fear. Fear is pain ... Each Cell deals with the pleasure of the voyeur, the thrill of looking and being looked at."

Maman

In the late 1990s, Bourgeois began using the spider as a central image in her art. Maman, which stands more than nine metres high, is a steel and marble sculpture from which an edition of six bronzes were subsequently cast. It first made an appearance as part of Bourgeois's commission for The Unilever Series for Tate Modern's Turbine Hall in 2000, and recently, the sculpture was installed at the Qatar National Convention Centre in Doha, Qatar.
It is the largest Spider sculpture ever made by Bourgeois.
Moreover, Maman alludes to the strength of her mother, with metaphors of spinning, weaving, nurture and protection. The prevalence of the spider motif in her work has given rise to her nickname as Spiderwoman.

Maisons fragiles / Empty Houses 
Bourgeois's Maisons fragiles / Empty Houses sculptures are parallel, high metallic structures supporting a simple tray. One must see them in person to feel their impact. They are not threatening or protecting, but bring out the depths of anxiety within you. Bachelard's findings from psychologists' tests show that an anxious child will draw a tall narrow house with no base. Bourgeois had a rocky/traumatic childhood and this could support the reason behind why these pieces were constructed.

Printmaking
Bourgeois's printmaking flourished during the early and late phases of her career: in the 1930s and 1940s, when she first came to New York from Paris, and then again starting in the 1980s, when her work began to receive wide recognition. Early on, she made prints at home on a small press, or at the renowned workshop Atelier 17. That period was followed by a long hiatus, as Bourgeois turned her attention fully to sculpture. It was not until she was in her seventies that she began to make prints again, encouraged first by print publishers. She set up her old press, and added a second, while also working closely with printers who came to her house to collaborate. A very active phase of printmaking followed, lasting until the artist's death. Over the course of her life, Bourgeois created approximately 1,500 printed compositions.

In 1990, Bourgeois decided to donate the complete archive of her printed work to The Museum of Modern Art. In 2013, The Museum launched the online catalogue raisonné, "Louise Bourgeois: The Complete Prints & Books." The site focuses on the artist's creative process and places Bourgeois's prints and illustrated books within the context of her overall production by including related works in other mediums that deal with the same themes and imagery.

Themes

One theme of Bourgeois's work is that of childhood trauma and hidden emotion. After Louise's mother became sick with influenza Louise's father began having affairs with other women, most notably with Sadie, Louise's English tutor. He would bring mistresses back home and be unfaithful in front of his whole family. Louise was extremely watchful and aware of the situation. This was the beginning of the artist's engagement with double standards related to gender and sexuality, which was expressed in much of her work. She recalls her father saying "I love you" repeatedly to her mother, despite infidelity. "He was the wolf, and she was the rational hare, forgiving and accepting him as he was." Her 1993 work Cell: You Better Grow Up, part of her Cell series, speaks directly to Louise's childhood trauma and the insecurity that surrounded her. 2002's Give or Take is defined by hidden emotion, representing the intense dilemma that people face throughout their lives as they attempt to balance the actions of giving and taking. This dilemma is not only represented by the shape of the sculpture, but also the heaviness of the material this piece is made of.

Motherhood is another recurrent theme of Bourgeois's work.  It was her mother who encouraged Bourgeois to draw and who involved her in the tapestry business. Bourgeois considered her mother to be intellectual and methodical; the continued motif of the spider in her work often represents her mother. The notion of a spider that spins and weaves its web is a direct reference to her parents' tapestry business and can also be seen as a metaphor for her mother, who repairs things.

Bourgeois has explored the concept of feminity through challenging the patriarchal standards and making artwork about motherhood rather than showing women as muses or ideals. She has been described as the 'reluctant hero of feminist art'.  Louise Bourgeois had a feminist approach to her work similar to fellow artists such as Agnes Martin and Eva Hesse, less driven by the political but rather made work that drew on their experiences of gender and sexuality, naturally engaging with women's issues.

Architecture and memory are important components of Bourgeois's work. Bourgeois's work are very organic, biological, reproductive feel to them; they draw attention to the work itself. Louise describes architecture as a visual expression of memory, or memory as a type of architecture.  The memory which is featured in much of her work is an invented memory – about the death or exorcism of her father.  The imagined memory is interwoven with her real memories including living across from a slaughterhouse and her father's affair. To Louise her father represented injury and war, aggrandizement of himself and belittlement of others and most importantly a man who represented betrayal. Her 1993 work Cell (Three White Marble Spheres) speaks to fear and captivity. The mirrors within the present an altered and distorted reality.

Sexuality is undoubtedly one of the most important themes in the work of Louise Bourgeois. The link between sexuality and fragility or insecurity is also powerful. It has been argued that this stems from her childhood memories and her father's affairs. 1952's Spiral Woman combines Louise's focus on female sexuality and torture. The flexing leg and arm muscles indicate that the Spiral Woman is still above though she is being suffocated and hung. 1995's In and Out uses cold metal materials to link sexuality with anger and perhaps even captivity.

The spiral in her work demonstrates the dangerous search for precarious equilibrium, accident-free permanent change, disarray, vertigo, whirlwind. There lies the simultaneously positive and negative, both future and past, breakup and return, hope and vanity, plan and memory.

Louise Bourgeois's work is powered by confessions, self-portraits, memories, fantasies of a restless being who is seeking through her sculpture a peace and an order which were missing throughout her childhood.

Collaboration

Do Not Abandon Me 
This collaboration took place over a span of two years with British artist Tracey Emin. The work was exhibited in London months after Bourgeois's death in 2010. The subject matter consists of male and female images. Although they appear sexual, it portrays a tiny female figure paying homage to a giant male figure, like a God. Louise Bourgeois did the water colors and Tracey Emin did the drawing on top. It took Emin two years to decide how to figure out what she would contribute in the collaboration. When she knew what to do, she finished all of the drawings in a day and believes every single one worked out perfectly. I Lost You is about losing children, losing life. Bourgeois had to bury her son as a parent. Abandonment for her is not only about losing her mother but her son as well. Despite the age gap between the two artists and differences in their work, the collaboration worked out gently and easily.

Selected works

Bibliography 
1982
1994
1994
1996
1998
2000
2001
2001
2008
2011
2011
2012
2015

Documentary
1987
2008

Exhibitions
1947Persistent Antagonism at San Francisco Museum of Modern Art, San Francisco.
1949Untitled at Art Institute of Chicago, Chicago.
1967Untitled at National Academy of Design, New York City.
 1972Number Seventy-Two at Storm King Art Center, Mountainville.
1982Louise Bourgeois, at The Museum of Modern Art, New York City.
1982Eyes, marble sculpture, at Metropolitan Museum of Art, New York City.
1984Nature Study: Eyes at Albright-Knox Art Gallery, Buffalo.
1987Louise Bourgeois: Sculpture 1947–1955 at Gallery Paule Anglim, San Francisco, California.
1992Sainte Sebastienne at Dallas Museum of Art, Dallas.
1993Loiuse Bourgeois: Recent Work at U.S. Pavilion, 45th Venice Biennale, Venice, Italy.
1993Helping Hands   in permanent display at Chicago Women's Park & Gardens as of 2011, Chicago.
1994The Prints of Louise Bourgeois at The Museum of Modern Art, New York City.
1994The Nest at San Francisco Museum of Modern Art, San Francisco.
1994Louise Bourgeois: The Locus of Memory, Works 1982–1993 at the Brooklyn Museum, Brooklyn and The Corcoran Gallery of Art, Washington, D.C.
1995Louise Bourgeois: The Locus of Memory, Works 1982–1993 at Galerie Rudolfinum, Prague.
1997Maman at Kemper Museum of Contemporary Art, Kansas City.
1999Maman at Guggenheim Museum Bilbao, Bilbao.
1999Granite eyeball benches and 25' bronze water fountain, at Agnes R. Katz Plaza, Pittsburgh, PA. Sculptures are currently on permanent display.
2000Fallen Woman at Galleria d'arte moderna Palazzo Forti, Verona.
2007Maman at Tate Modern, London.
2008Louise Bourgeois at Centre Georges Pompidou, Paris, Exhibition date: 5 March 2008 – 2 June 2008.
2008Louise Bourgeois Full Career Retrospective at Solomon R. Guggenheim Museum, New York City.
2008Nature Study at Inverleith House, Edinburgh.
2008Louise Bourgeois for Capodimonte at National Museum of Capodimonte, Naples.
2009Louise Bourgeois: Moi, Eugénie Grandet, un processus d'identification at Maison de Balzac, Paris.
2010Louise Bourgeois: The Fabric Works, at Fondazione Vedova Venice. Travelling to Hauser & Wirth, London.
2010Louise Bourgeois: Mother and Child at Gallery Paule Anglim, San Francisco, California.
2011Louise Bourgeois: À L'Infini at Fondation Beyeler, Riehen, Exhibition date: 3 Sep 2011 – 8 Jan 2012.
2011Louise Bourgeois. The Return of the Repressed, at Fundación Proa, Buenos Aires.Travelling to Instituto Tomie Ohtake, São Paulo and Museu de Arte Moderna, Rio de Janeiro.
2011Louise Bourgeois (1911–2010) at the National Gallery of Canada, Ottawa, Ontario, Canada, Exhibition date: 21 Apr 2011 – 18 Mar 2012.
2012Louise Bourgeois: Conscious and Unconscious at the Qatar Museums Authority Gallery, Katara, Doha, Qatar, Exhibition date: 20 Jan 2012 – 1 Jun 2012.
2012Louise Bourgeois: The Return of The Repressed at Freud Museum, Exhibition date: 7 March 2012 – 27 May 2012.
2012Louise Bourgeois: Late Works at Heide Museum of Modern Art, Exhibition date: 24 November 2012 – 11 March 2013.
2013Louise Bourgeois 1911–2010 at Museum of Contemporary Canadian Art, Exhibition date: 22 June 2013 – 11 Aug 2013.
2014Louise Bourgeois: A Woman Without Secrets at Middlesbrough Institute of Modern Art, Exhibition date: 18 Jul 2014 – 12 Oct 2014.
2015ARTIST ROOMS: Louise Bourgeois: A Woman Without Secrets at Southampton City Art Gallery, Exhibition date: 16 Jan 2015 – 18 April 2015.
2015Louise Bourgeois. Structures of Existence: the Cells at Haus der Kunst, Munich, Germany, Exhibition date: 27 Feb 2015 – 2 Aug 2015.
2015Louise Bourgeois: I Have Been to Hell and Back at Moderna Museet, Stockholm, Sweden, Exhibition date: 14 Feb 2015 – 17 May 2015.
2016Louise Bourgeois: Structures of Existence: The Cells at Guggenheim Museum, Bilbao, Spain, Exhibition date: 18 March 2016 – 4 September 2016.
2016Louise Bourgeois: Turning Inwards at Hauser & Wirth, Switzerland, Exhibition date: 2 Oct 2016 – 1 Jan 2017
2017Louise Bourgeois: Human Nature: Doing, Undoing, Redoing at Kistefos-Museet, Jevnaker, Norway, Exhibition date: 21 May 2017 – 9 Oct 2017.
2017Louise Bourgeois: Spiders at San Francisco Museum of Modern Art, Exhibition date: 7 Oct 2017 – 4 Sept 2018.
2017Louise Bourgeois: Twosome at Tel Aviv Museum of Art, Tel Aviv, Israel, Exhibition date: 7 Sept 2017 – 17 Feb 2018.
2017Louise Bourgeois: An Unfolding Portrait at The Museum of Modern Art, Exhibition date: 24 Sept 2017 – 28 Jan 2018.
2018Louise Bourgeois: The Empty House at Schinkel Pavillon, Berlin, Exhibition date: 21 April 2018 – 29 July 2018.
2018Louise Bourgeois: To Unravel a Torment at Glenstone Museum, Potomac, MD, United States, Exhibition date: 10 May 2017 – 1 Jan 2020.
2019Louise Bourgeois & Alex Van Gelder at UM Museum, Seoul, South Korea, Exhibition date: 1 Oct 2019 – 31 Dec 2019.
20191999-12-03 Abels, Carolyn, "Katz Plaza in Cultural District is Dedicated," Pittsburgh Post-Gazette (v73, n125, B-1)
2021Louise Bourgeois, Freud's Daughter at The Jewish Museum, New York, NY, United States, Exhibition date: 21 May 2021 – 12 Sept 2021.

Recognition
 1972: Mary Beth Edelson's Some Living American Women Artists / Last Supper (1972) appropriated Leonardo da Vinci's The Last Supper, with the heads of notable women artists collaged over the heads of Christ and his apostles. Bourgeois was among those notable women artists. This image, addressing the role of religious and art historical iconography in the subordination of women, became "one of the most iconic images of the feminist art movement."
1977: Honorary doctorate from Yale University
1981: Fellow of the American Academy of Arts and Sciences
1990: Elected into National Academy of Design
1990: Edward MacDowell Medal, MacDowell Colony, Peterborough, NH.
1991: Lifetime Achievement in Contemporary Sculpture Award (Hamilton, New Jersey, USA)
1997: National Medal of Arts
1999: Praemium Imperiale for lifetime achievement
1999: Golden Lion at the Venice Biennale
2003: Wolf Foundation Prize in the Arts (Jerusalem)
2005: Austrian Decoration for Science and Art
2008: National Order of the Legion of Honour
2009: "Commandeur" of the pataphysical Ordre de la Grande Gidouille.
2009: Honored by the National Women's Hall of Fame

Collections
Major holdings of her work include the following.

 US: the National Gallery of Art in Washington, D.C.; the Museum of Modern Art in New York and Nasher Sculpture Center; the San Francisco Museum of Modern Art;
 Canada: National Gallery of Canada;
 UK: Tate Modern in London;
 France: Centre Pompidou in Paris.
Throughout her career, Bourgeois knew many of her core collectors, such as Ginny Williams, Agnes Gund, Ydessa Hendeles and Ursula Hauser. Other private collections with notable Bourgeois pieces include the Goetz Collection in Munich.

Art market
Bourgeois started working with gallerist Paule Anglim in San Francisco in 1987, Karsten Greve in Paris in 1990, and Hauser & Wirth in 1997. Hauser & Wirth has been the principal gallery for her estate. Others, such as Kukje Gallery in Seoul and Xavier Hufkens in Brussels continue to deal in her work.

In 2011 one of Bourgeois's works, titled Spider, sold for $10.7 million, a new record price for the artist at auction, and the highest price paid for a work by a woman at the time. In late 2015, the piece sold at another Christie's auction for $28.2 million.

References

Further reading

External links

Louise Bourgeois in The Museum of Fine Arts, Houston: https://www.mfah.org/blogs/inside-mfah/a-confessional-sculpture-by-louise-bourgeois
Louise Bourgeois in The Museum of Modern Art Online Collection
Louise Bourgeois: The Complete Prints & Books – The Museum of Modern Art
Louise Bourgeois at Hauser & Wirth
'My art is a form of restoration', interview with Rachel Cooke for The Observer, 14 October 2007
Louise Bourgeois at the Qatar National Convention Center
Louise Bourgeois: À L’Infini. Exhibition at Fondation Beyeler Exhibition and interview with curator Dr. Ulf Küster (video)
 Webcam of the sculpture "Maman" outside of the National Gallery of Canada, Ottawa
 Louise Bourgeois Louise Bourgeois's Exhibition at Fundació Antoni Tàpies 6/11/1990 – 6/1/1991
 
Louise Bourgeois at Schinkel Pavillon Berlin
Louise Bourgeois | HOW TO SEE the artist with MoMA Chief Curator Emerita Deborah Wye
Louise Bourgeois | HOW TO SEE the artist with Sewon Kang
Archives of American Art, Smithsonian Institution: Oral History Interview

1911 births
2010 deaths
20th-century French sculptors
21st-century French sculptors
Abstract expressionist artists
Académie Julian alumni
École des Beaux-Arts alumni
Artists from Paris
Art Students League of New York alumni
French women artists
French contemporary artists
French installation artists
Members of the American Academy of Arts and Letters
United States National Medal of Arts recipients
Wolf Prize in Arts laureates
Recipients of the Praemium Imperiale
Recipients of the Austrian Decoration for Science and Art
Recipients of the Legion of Honour
École du Louvre alumni
Fellows of the American Academy of Arts and Sciences
20th-century American women artists
21st-century American women artists
American women printmakers
20th-century American printmakers
20th-century American sculptors
21st-century American sculptors
People with acquired American citizenship
Sculptors from New York (state)
People from Chelsea, Manhattan
Brooklyn College faculty
Women installation artists
French women printmakers
20th-century French women
French emigrants to the United States